Battista Mario Salvatore Ricca (born 22 January 1956) is prelate of the Vatican Bank.

References

Living people
Vatican City bankers
1956 births